Oļegs Latiševs (born 1 June 1980), occasionally referred to by his native Russian name Oleg Latyshev, is a Latvian FIBA basketball referee. His cooperation with FIBA started in 2003  and with Euroleague in 2007.

Latisevs started to work as a referee already at the age of 15 (1995), when he was awarded the referee licence and was invited as a referee to the Championship of Latvian Youth Basketball League. After five seasons (2000), he was awarded National referee category, becoming the referee of the Latvian Major Basketball League.

He was awarded FIBA Basketball referee licence at the age of 23 (2003). Starting from 2004 he was regularly invited as a referee to key European and International Championships. The presence of Latisevs was requested at all EuroBasket Competitions starting from 2005. He also participated in two FIBA Basketball World Cups and nine seasons of Euroleague, in five of which he took part as a referee for Final Four.

In 2012 and 2016 Latisevs became one of 30 FIBA referees (in total, in Europe 350 referees have FIBA Basketball referee licences) who had an honour to be a referee for the Olympic Games. In total, Latisevs led more than 450 Basketball matches organised by FIBA and Euroleague.

Referee career 
Latisevs has taken part as a referee in more than 1300 matches, which he was refereeing during National, European and International Championships. His record of accomplishment includes servicing the most important Championships between the National Teams (the Olympic Games, FIBA Basketball World Cup, EuroBasket, European Basketball Championship (U16/ U18/ U20), World Cup U19) and Professional Club Championships (Euroleague, ULEB Eurocup, VTB United League, Baltic Basketball League, Latvian Basketball League).

Starting from 2000, Latisevs serviced all Latvian Basketball League Championships, in total, leading more than 500 matches. The participation of Latisevs as a referee seasonally was the following: 2003/2004 - 35 matches, 2004/2005 – 42 matches, 2005/2006 – 44 matches, 2006/2007 – 46 matches, 2007/2008 – 32 matches, 2008/2009 – 39 matches, 2009/2010 – 27 matches, 2010/2011 – 45 matches, 2011/2012 – 32 matches, 2012/2013 – 25 matches, 2013/2014 – 25 matches, 2014/2015 – 20 matches, 2015/2016 – 22 matches.

In the same year of 2000, Latisevs was invited as a referee to Baltic Basketball League, where in total he serviced more than 300 matches. The participation of Latisevs as a referee seasonally was the following: 2003/2004 - 23 matches, 2004/2005 – 18 matches, 2005/2006 – 22 matches, 2006/2007 – 32 matches, 2007/2008 – 30 matches, 2008/2009 – 31 matches, 2009/2010 – 22 matches, 2010/2011 – 17 matches, 2011/2012 – 5 matches, 2012/2013 – 10 matches, 2013/2014 – 14 matches, 2014/2015 – 5 matches, 2015/2016 – 8 matches.

He has also been the long-term referee for VTB United League, while participating mainly in the finals. The participation of Latisevs as a referee seasonally was the following: 2008/2009 – 3 matches, 2009/2010 – 6 matches, 2010/2011 – 10 matches, 2011/2012 – 25 matches, 2012/2013 – 22 matches, 2013/2014 – 16 matches, 2014/2015 – 21 matches, 2015/2016 – 20 matches. In total 123 matches.

Cooperation with FIBA Europe 
The cooperative work with FIBA Europe started in 2003 with the 4th tier European Championship (in accordance to the European Professional Club Basketball System classification), in particular FIBA Eurocup Challenge. The League in which National teams took part was established in 2002 and terminated in 2006.

He also serviced matches in other subordinated to FIBA Europe Championships, in total having worked at 267 matches organised by FIBA Europe.

In season 2003/2004 Latisevs was invited to Europe Championship for young men in the age category under 16 (FIBA Europe Under-16 Championship). As a result, he became the permanent Europe Championship referee for young men in the age categories under 16, under 18, under 20 (FIBA Europe Under-16, Under-18, Under-20 Championship).

Already in 2005 Latisevs was regularly invited as a referee to Europe Basketball Championship (Eurobasket) that took place once in two years among European Teams that have qualified for FIBA Basketball World Cup and the Olympic Games.

Participation in FIBA Europe Tournament

Cooperation with Euroleague 
After the end of four season work with FIBA Europe in 2007/2008 Latisevs was invited to the 1st tier Championships (Euroleague) and 2nd tier European Transnational Championships (Basketball Eurocup, known also as ULEB Eurocup). The organiser and the operator of these Championships for state-members of FIBA Europe is Euroleague. Already during the third season of the work with Euroleague, Latisevs was delegated as referee to Euroleague Final Four.

During his refereeing career, Latisevs serviced five Euroleague Final Fours. The participation of Latisevs in Euroleague Championships was the following: 2007/2008 – 6 matches, 2008/2009 – 7 matches, 2009/2010 –11 matches, 2010/2011 – 13 matches, 2011/2012 – 12 matches, 2012/2013 – 21 matches, 2013/2014 – 19 matches, 2014/2015 – 18 matches, 2015/2016 – 28 matches. To sum up, year of 2016 was the record year for Latisevs with regard to the number of serviced matches.  In total – 135 matches.

The participation of Latisevs in ULEB Eurocup as a referee seasonally was the following: 2007/2008 – 5 matches, 2008/2009 – 8 matches, 2009/2010 –3 matches, 2010/2011 – 4 matches, 2011/2012 – 7 matches, 2012/2013 – 3 matches, 2013/2014 – 8 matches, 2014/2015 – 6 matches, 2015/2016 – 3 matches. In total – 47 matches.

Cooperation with NBA 
Latisevs has an experience in the work in NBA Championships. In 2013 Latisevs serviced the matches of Summer NBA League in Las Vegas, USA. This event was organised in the framework of educational programme for FIBA referees, the aim of which was to share experience between the best FIBA referees from Europe, Asia, Oceania and the leading USA referees. In 2015 he participated as a referee in NBA Global Games. This was the series of matches in which NBA teams took part and that took place outside of USA and Canada. Recently, the Championship got more popular among leading European Professional Clubs and became the initial assessment before the beginning of the season.

Career achievements 
The highlight of Latisevs’ career is the participation in FIBA Basketball World Cup, the leading event in the International Basketball Federation. Latisevs serviced FIBA Basketball World Cup in 2010 (Turkey) and in 2014 (Spain).

Latisevs has also taken part in the Olympic Games (London 2012, Rio de Janeiro 2016). The London Olympics 2012 were serviced by 30 FIBA Basketball referees, 13 of them – from Europe. In the history of independent Latvia, it was the first time when the referee from this state was invited to the Olympic Games. Until this time in the different levels of Olympic Games took part the following persons from Latvia: Valdemars Baumanis 1936, Aleksandrs Gomelskis 1956, Mariss Bernats 1980. During the Olympic Games 2012 Latisevs serviced seven games, including quarter-final match of women Championship Australia – China.

Basketball Championship of the Olympic Games 2016 in Rio de Janeiro also is serviced by 30 FIBA referees However, the number of referees from Europe is decreasing: only 10 Europeans and Latisevs is among them Latisevs has refereed 9 games at the Basketball at the 2016 Summer Olympics, including the men's semifinal game Australia - Serbia.

Participation in Olympic Games 2016

Social activity 
In 2007 Latisevs chaired Referee Committee of Latvian Basketball Federation. He made his contributions to the promotion of the culture of Basketball refereeing. In particular, he founded the programme for the support of young referees. Referees who have FIBA Basketball licences in the course of one year teach junior referees the particulars of “the craft”, analyse their practical work, and help to refine their manner of refereeing.

Apart from this Latisevs regularly organises seminars for young referees that are devoted to the art of verbal and non-verbal communication on the court, the self-presentation and the right physical and moral preparation for Championships 

Under the guidance of Latisevs, the committee made a decision on the admittance to FIBA examinations of four Latvian referees, three of whom received the licence from the International Basketball Federation''.

Besides the administrative and refereeing work, Latisevs manages modern rehabilitation centre, specializing in occupational therapy, healing gymnastics, taping, ultrasound therapy. The centre supports Latvian sportsmen: athletes, volleyball players, basketball players etc., helps them to recover from traumas and prepare for championships.

References

Basketball in Latvia
1980 births
Living people
EuroLeague referees
FIBA referees
Latvian people of Russian descent
University of Latvia alumni